Newtown, also referred to as Aston New Town, is an inner city area of Birmingham, England, just to the north of the city centre.

Newtown is centred on the A34 road, locally named New Town Row which runs from Birmingham City Centre through north-west Birmingham into Walsall; and part of the A4540 which is the ring-road around the centre of the city. Newtown is bordered by a number of other areas such as the Jewellery Quarter, the Gun Quarter and the University of Aston. West is Hockley and the Hockley Flyover, to the north west is Lozells and to the north east is Aston.

Points of interest include The Bartons Arms, an historic pub; Aston Hippodrome, a defunct theatre; The Elbow Room, a nightclub; and  The Drum Arts Centre.

As of May 2018, Newtown ward is served by one Labour councillor; Ziaul Islam.

Notable links
Larry Wright (priest), former Rector of St George's Newtown. 
Pelé Reid, British heavyweight born in Newtown
Saido Berahino, from Burundi to Newtown, aged 10

Tower blocks 
Aston underwent large scale redevelopment following the Second World War, Newtown was a large project in the Aston area of Birmingham, England to construct 16 tower blocks. South Aston was designated a renewal area involving comprehensive redevelopment of the traditional area known as "Aston New Town". The area, was more commonly called simply "Newtown" and is a large estate consisting of sixteen tower blocks, five of which have since been demolished. The project was approved in 1968. Three 20-storey tower blocks on the complex contained 354 flats alone.

Existing 
Hodgson Tower
Baldwin House
Inkerman House
Sadler House
Fallows House
James House
Lloyd House
Reynolds House
Thornton House
Weston House
Manton House

Demolished 
Wiggin Tower
Brooks Tower
Bower House
Sayer House
White House

References 

Areas of Birmingham, West Midlands